Fridericia elegans is a species of plants in the family Bignoniaceae. It is found in Brazil, where it is poisonous to livestock and has caused severe losses.

References

External links
 
 Fridericia elegans at The Plant List
 Fridericia elegans at Tropicos

Bignoniaceae
Plants described in 2013
Flora of Brazil